Jack Tyler Diamond (born 12 January 2000) is an English professional footballer who plays as a winger for Lincoln City, on loan from  club Sunderland.

Career
Born in Gateshead, Tyne and Wear, Diamond began his career with Sunderland, joining their academy at the age of 14. He made his senior debut on 9 October 2018, in the EFL Trophy, alongside Lee Connelly.

He moved on loan to Harrogate Town in September 2019. Later that month the club announced they wanted the loan to be extended. In November 2019 the loan was extended until the end of the season. That same month he said he was looking forward to playing for Harrogate in the FA Cup.

He scored his first goal for Sunderland in an EFL Trophy tie against Carlisle United on 6 October 2020.

He returned on loan to Harrogate Town on 31 August 2021. He was recalled by Sunderland on 7 January 2022. On 26 January he returned to Harrogate Town on loan for the rest of the season.

In August 2022 he signed for Lincoln City on loan for the rest of the season. He made his debut against Barnsley in the EFL Trophy on 30 August 2022. He would score his first goal in Imps colours, against Derby County from the penalty spot in a 2-0 win and in the following game against Bristol Rovers he would score his first career hattrick. This form saw him nominated for the EFL League One Player of the Month for September 2022.

Career statistics

Honours
Harrogate Town
National League play-offs: 2020

Sunderland
EFL Trophy: 2020–21

References

2000 births
Living people
Footballers from Gateshead
English footballers
Association football wingers
Sunderland A.F.C. players
Harrogate Town A.F.C. players
Lincoln City F.C. players
National League (English football) players
English Football League players